Atticora is a genus of bird in the swallow family Hirundinidae that are found in South America.

Species
The genus contains three species:

References

 
Hirundinidae
Bird genera
 

Taxonomy articles created by Polbot